Michael Goodwin may refer to:

 Michael Goodwin (architect), architect and politician in the Phoenix, Arizona area
 Michael Goodwin (actor), American actor known for his roles in television and films